Ron Easey (born 23 February 1960) is an Australian equestrian. He competed in two events at the 2000 Summer Olympics.

Easey was named the 2022 Ekka Legend in recognition of his contribution to Ekka as a show jumping rider since 1984, winning championships on many occasions.

References

External links
 

1960 births
Living people
Australian male equestrians
Olympic equestrians of Australia
Equestrians at the 2000 Summer Olympics